Deighton may refer to:

People 
 Ernest Deighton (1889–1957), flying ace
 Jack Deighton, English footballer
 Jeremy Deighton (born 1988), American soccer player
 John Deighton (1830–1875), bar owner
 Len Deighton (born 1929), author
 Matt Deighton, singer-songwriter, member of Mother Earth
 Michelle Deighton, model

Places 
 Deighton, Hambleton, a village and civil parish in the Hambleton district of North Yorkshire
 Deighton, Huddersfield, a district of Huddersfield, West Yorkshire
 Deighton railway station
 Deighton, York, a village and civil parish in the unitary authority of the City of York, North Yorkshire
 Kirk Deighton, a village and civil parish in Leeds metropolitan District, West Yorkshire
 North Deighton, a village and civil parish in the Harrogate district of North Yorkshire, England

See also
 Dighton (disambiguation)